Nariverūuth Thalaiyār (Tamil: நரிவெரூஉத் தலையார்) was a poet of the Sangam period, to whom 5 verses of the Sangam literature have been attributed, including verse 33 of the Tiruvalluva Maalai.

Biography
Nariveruvu Thalaiyar was known for his sickness, which was cured by the Chera king Cheraman Karuvuraeriya Olvat Kopperuncheral Irumporai. His head was said to be frightening enough to scare away a carcass-scavenging jackal, hence the given name.

Contribution to the Sangam literature
Nariveruvu Thalaiyar has written 5 Sangam verses, including 2 in Kurunthogai (verses 5 and 236), 2 in Purananuru (verses 5 and 195), and 1 in Tiruvalluva Maalai (verse 33).

See also

 Sangam literature
 List of Sangam poets
 Tiruvalluva Maalai

Notes

Tamil philosophy
Tamil poets
Sangam poets
Tiruvalluva Maalai contributors